Trapezioidea is a superfamily of crabs. Its members live symbiotically with corals, and have a fossil record stretching back to the Eocene.

Families
The World Register of Marine Species lists the following families:
Domeciidae Ortmann, 1893
Tetraliidae Castro, Ng & Ahyong, 2004
Trapeziidae Miers, 1886

References

Crabs
Arthropod superfamilies